Dubréka is a prefecture located in the Kindia Region of Guinea. The capital is Dubréka. The prefecture covers an area of 4,350 km² and has a population of 330,548.

Sub-prefectures
The prefecture is divided administratively into 7 sub-prefectures:
 Dubréka-Centre
 Badi
 Falessade
 Khorira
 Ouassou
 Tanéné
 Tondon

Prefectures of Guinea
Kindia Region